Victim of Changes is ex-Judas Priest singer Al Atkins's fourth release, named after a Judas Priest song of the same name originally featured on the Sad Wings of Destiny album.  The album's sleeve contains three pages of historic photos and a biography outlining his days in Judas Priest. Former Judas Priest drummer Dave Holland plays on this release.

Recording
The album was recorded during the summer of 1997 at Mad Hat Studios in Walsall, England. Mark Stuart was the engineer.

Song information
"Mind Conception" and "Holy Is the Man" appeared on Judas Priest's 1971 demo. These songs were not featured on any Judas Priest releases.
"Never Satisfied", "Winter", "Caviar and Meths" all appeared on Rocka Rolla; "Victim of Changes" appeared on Sad Wings of Destiny, with lead vocals by Atkins's replacement Rob Halford.

Track listing
 "Mind Conception" (Al Atkins) – 3:46
 "Holy Is the Man" (Atkins) – 5:11
 "Never Satisfied" (Atkins, K.K. Downing) – 5:20
 "The Melt Down" (Paul May) – 4:02
 "Winter" (Atkins, Downing, Ian Hill) - 4:01
 "Metanoia" (May) – 2:29
 "Caviar and Meths" (Atkins) – 7:12
 "Black Sheep of the Family" (Steve Hammond) –  3:58
 "Victim of Changes" (Atkins, Rob Halford, Downing, Glenn Tipton) – 6:50

Personnel
Al Atkins - vocals
Paul May - guitar
Pete Emms - bass guitar
Dave Holland - drums

with

Andy Pyke - backup vocals

1998 albums
Al Atkins albums